Mercy Asiedu (born 9 May 1971) is a Ghanaian veteran actress who has contributed to the growth of the movie industry. She is known for the role she played in Concert Party and Asoreba. She is known as being one of the popular Kumawood actresses starring in several roles in the 2000s.

Career
She began acting when she was a teenager, as part of the Kristo Asafor Concert Party group. She is known for the controversial roles she has played in movies. She has acted in several Kumawood movies, movies from Kumasi produced in the local dialect of the Akans, Twi. She has been in movies with Agya Koo, Lil Win, Kwaku Manu, Aboagye Brenya to mention a few.

Personal life 
On 2 April 2017, she married Nana Agyemang Badu Duah, a Chief of Kunsu in the Ahafo Ano South District in the Ashanti Region. She has three children, two sons and a daughter.

Politics 
In September 2016, she endorsed the Presidential candidate of the New Patriotic Party, Nana Addo Dankwa Akufo-Addo. In July 2016, she came out to say that she would curse anyone who made claims that she had collected money to campaign for the then ruling National Democratic Congress.

Filmography
 Obaakofou
 Sumsum Aware
 Kakra Yebedie
 Agya Koo Trotro
 Ghana Yonko
 Emaa doduo Kunu
 Divine Prayer
 Obi Yaa
 Sama Te fie 
 Old Soldier

References

External links 

 Official Instagram Page
 DELAY interviews Mercy Asiedu

1971 births
Living people
21st-century Ghanaian actresses
Ghanaian film actresses